Palle Christiansen (born 25 June 1973) is a Greenlandic politician. A member of the Democrats and is currently Minister for Education, Science and Nordic Cooperation.

References

1973 births
Living people
Greenlandic Inuit people
Greenlandic people of Danish descent
Democrats (Greenland) politicians
Government ministers of Greenland